South African Deaf Sports Federation  (SADSF) is the official governing body of Deaf Sports in South Africa responsible for sending, supporting, funding the teams representing South Africa and the deaf sportspeople at the  Deaflympics, Deaf World Championships. The organisation took the responsibility for sending deaf sportspeople at the Deaflympics since 1993.

The SADSF was established in 1981 and it is affiliated with the Comite International des Sports des Sourds (CISS), which is the world governing body of Deaf sports.

The South African Deaf Sports Federation is also affiliated with the  South African Sports Confederation and Olympic Committee (SASCOC), which is the national governing body in South Africa responsible for Olympics and Paralympics.

The South African Sports Confederation and Olympic Committee raised adequate funds by convincing the South African Deaf Sports Federation when it faced financial problems to send the Deaf athletes for the 2013 Summer Deaflympics held in Sofia, Bulgaria.

See also
 Sport in South Africa

References

External links
 Official website

Deaf sports
Disability organisations based in South Africa
Parasports in South Africa
1981 establishments in South Africa
Deaf sports organizations
Sports organizations established in 1981
Deaf culture in South Africa